All Saints', Wynnewood is a parish of the Episcopal Diocese of Pennsylvania located in Wynnewood, Montgomery County. In 2019, it reported 149 members, average attendance of 91, and $229,361 in plate and pledge financial support.

The church's first services as a mission congregation were held in a private house on January 1, 1911, with the laying of a cornerstone on October 7, 1911, by Bishop Thomas J. Garland and first services in the church on December 18, 1911. It was admitted into union with the diocesan convention in 1917. The building was consecrated by Bishop Philip M. Rhinelander on Sexagesima Sunday, January 31, 1921. The building was enlarged significantly in 1921 with additions by the Furness & Evans architectural partnership. A rood and roodscreen were erected in 1925. The current parish house was built in 1955.

The church's organ is by Danish-American builder M. P. Möller (Opus R-910, 1974), previously Skinner Organ Co. (Opus 814, 1929). It has 25 ranks, 1,676 pipes, four divisions, three manuals, 21 stops, and 32 registers. It also previously had a two-manual Bates & Culley organ (1912). A lady chapel was built and consecrated in 1961. The church includes significant stained glass by Nicola D'Ascenzo and Duncan Niles Terry; many of the windows are from the Philadelphia studio of English-born artist Arthur R. Willett. The church also includes work by Philadelphia liturgical artist Davis d'Ambly.

The parish's priest in charge is the Rev. Edward Rix, a graduate of the University of King's College in Nova Scotia. The church uses the 1928 Book of Common Prayer at all services.

Philadelphia Orchestra Vox Ama Deus is in residence in the parish, led by the current parish organist and Choir Master, Dr. Valentin Radu.

Rectors and clergy
Dr. Andrew Swanton Burke (priest in charge 1911-1918, rector 1918-1919)
Dr. Gibson Bell (1919-1920, locum tenens, rector 1920–1956)
Canon John J. Albert (1956-1980)
Canon Harry E. Krauss, III (1980-1997)
Thomas L. Monnat (interim, 1997)
Richard Upsher Smith (1997-2001)
Edward Rix (interim rector 2001–2013, priest in charge 2013-present)

References
Prepared for Us to Walk In: The History of All Saints' Church, Wynnewood, Pennsylvania, 1911-1986 (©1986, the Rector, Wardens and Vestry of All Saints' Church)

External links 
Official parish website 
All Saints' Episcopal Church Memorial Garden
1928 Book of Common Prayer from the Society of Archbishop Justus
Pipe organ database
Pipe organ database
Episcopal Diocese of Pennsylvania

1911 establishments in Pennsylvania
Christian organizations established in the 1910s
Episcopal Church in Pennsylvania
Religious organizations established in 1911
20th-century Episcopal church buildings